Kokoro is a local snack served amongst the Yoruba people of Nigeria, it is made from cornflour, sugar , yam flour or Garri to make it crunchy.

It can be stored for a long time if kept away from moisture and air. The two types of kokoro are the plain type and peppered one.

After adding the corn flour in a hot water, it is stirred continuously as when making semovita.

See also 

 Garri
 Nigeria cuisine
 West Africa cuisine

References 

Yoruba cuisine
Nigerian cuisine